The 2016 Women's Africa Cup of Nations qualification was a women's football competition which decided the participating teams of the 2016 Women's Africa Cup of Nations.

A total of eight teams qualified to play in the final tournament, including Cameroon who qualified automatically as hosts.

Teams
A total of 23 CAF member national teams entered the qualifying rounds.

1 Initially Togo entered the qualification but withdrew and were replaced by Ethiopia. Togo were sanctioned by the CAF and excluded from participating in the 2018 tournament.

Format
Qualification ties were played on a home-and-away two-legged basis. If the aggregate score was tied after the second leg, the away goals rule would be applied, and if still level, the penalty shoot-out would be used to determine the winner (no extra time would be played).

The seven winners of the second round qualified for the final tournament.

Schedule
The schedule of the qualifying rounds was as follows.

The second round was initially scheduled to be played on 8–10 April (first leg) and 22–24 April (second leg), but was later changed to be played during the FIFA International Match Calendar dates of 4–12 April.

First round

|}

 won 2–1 on aggregate.

 won 3–2 on aggregate.

 won 5–3 on aggregate.

 won 12–0 on aggregate.

 won 2–1 on aggregate.

 advanced after DR Congo withdrew for financial reasons.

1–1 on aggregate.  won 4–2 on penalties.

 won 2–0 on aggregate.

 won 11–0 on aggregate.

Second round
Winners qualified for 2016 Africa Women Cup of Nations.

|}

 won 3–2 on aggregate. were awarded the tie after Equatorial Guinea were disqualified for fielding an ineligible player. won 4–2 on aggregate.2–2 on aggregate.  won on away goals rule.3–3 on aggregate.  won on away goals rule. won 3–1 on aggregate. won 6–1 on aggregate. won 5–0 on aggregate.''

Qualified teams
The following eight teams qualified for the final tournament.

1 Bold indicates champion for that year. Italic indicates host for that year.

Goalscorers
5 goals

 Aliaa Shoukry*

3 goals

 Naïma Bouhenni-Benziane
 Samira Suleman
 Sanah Mollo
 Grace Chanda
 Noria Sosala

2 goals

 Dalila Zerrouki
 Nondi Mahlasela
 Refilwe Tholakele
 Engy Ahmed*
 Princella Adubea
 Binta Diarra
 Zenatha Coleman
 Binta Diakhaté
 Kudakwashe Bhasopo
 Erina Jeke

1 goal

 Refilwe Mathlo
 Tlamelo Motlhale
 Bame Ngenda
 Bonang Otlhagile
 Thuto Ramafifi
 Golebaone Selebatso
 Lesaane Tshoso
 Mahira Ali
 Neivin Gamal
 Nadeen Gazy
 Fayza Hidar
 Mahira Ali Mohammed*
 Yasmine Samir
 Noha Tarek*
 Genoveva Añonma
 Jade Boho
 Adriana Tiga
 Loza Abera
 Portia Boakye
 Fatoumata Kanté
 Rebecca Elloh
 Ines Nrehy
 Mwanalima Adam
 Enez Medeizi Mango
 Djeneba Baradji
 Bintou Koite
 Ibtissam Jraidi
 Lorraine Jossob
 Rita Chikwelu
 Osarenoma Igbinovia
 Chioma Wogu
 Mamello Makhabane
 Nompumelelo Nyandeni
 Donisia Daniel Minja
 Mwanahamisi Omary
 Ella Kaabachi
 Sabrine Mamay
 Imen Mchara
 Misozi Zulu
 Daisy Kaitano
 Emmculate Msipa
 Samkelisiwe Zulu

Own goal

 Fatima Sekouane (against Kenya)

* includes a goal scored at Egypt vs. Libya match, which has no goal scorers references.

References

External links
10th Africa Women Cup Of Nations, Cameroon 2016, CAFonline.com

Qualification
Women Cup of Nations qualification
2016 in women's association football
2016